The Hilversum culture is a prehistoric material culture found in middle Bronze Age in the region of the southern Netherlands and northern Belgium. It has been associated with the Wessex culture from the same period in southern England, and is one of the material cultures of this part of northwestern continental Europe which has been proposed to have had a "Nordwestblock" language which was Indo-European, but neither Germanic nor Celtic.

The culture was bordered to its northeast by the Elp culture, to which it may have been related, and to its north by the Hoogkarspel culture.

An urn found there, initially classified as being of the Deverel–Rimbury type, was found to be older than was expected: radiocarbon dating pointed to 3450 BP (1770 +/-250 cal BC). This led archeologist  to propose a new classification, the Hilversum type, and the conclusion that later continental Deverel pottery would have "devolved" from this type.

Gallery

See Also

Bronze Age Britain
Unetice culture
Armorican Tumulus culture
Tumulus culture
Nordic Bronze Age
Argaric culture

References

External links

Bronze Age cultures of Europe
Archaeological cultures of Western Europe
Archaeological cultures in Belgium
Archaeological cultures in France
Archaeological cultures in the Netherlands